Paul Gianni is an Australian Paralympic athlete. He was a B-classified competitor at the 1976 Summer Paralympics representing Australia in high jump, long jump, javelin, shot put and the 100 m.  In the 100 m he won a bronze  medal.

References

External links
 Paul Gianni - Athletics Australia Results

Paralympic athletes of Australia
Athletes (track and field) at the 1976 Summer Paralympics
Paralympic bronze medalists for Australia
Living people
Medalists at the 1976 Summer Paralympics
Year of birth missing (living people)
Paralympic medalists in athletics (track and field)
Australian male high jumpers
Australian male long jumpers
Australian male javelin throwers
Australian male shot putters
Australian male sprinters
Visually impaired high jumpers
Visually impaired long jumpers
Visually impaired javelin throwers
Visually impaired shot putters
Visually impaired sprinters
Paralympic high jumpers
Paralympic long jumpers
Paralympic javelin throwers
Paralympic shot putters
Paralympic sprinters